Sam Pease is an author, television presenter, journalist and TV host.

Early life
Pease was born in England and moved to New Zealand in 1978. Her deceased parents were South African born with African and Eurasian heritage.

Career
Pease began her career with TV3 as a teenager. Although she began with an entry-level role, she soon moved into journalism and directing. Her first on-air role was for Nightline in the nineties interviewing the Beastie Boys during their first visit to New Zealand.

In later years, Pease presented TVNZ's Use as Directed, Kiwi Living and spent 5 years as the TV host of Family Health Diaries and Healtheries.

Pease is the author of three books for Penguin Random House, Eat Less Crap Lose That Fat which spent 9 weeks at #1 in NZ, Date Like A Dude and The Jet Project.

Personal life
Pease has one son and is divorced.

References

Living people
New Zealand journalists
New Zealand television presenters
New Zealand non-fiction writers
Year of birth missing (living people)